Sharp Peak is a sharp rocky peak rising to 500 m in the northeast of Vidin Heights on Varna Peninsula, Livingston Island in the South Shetland Islands, Antarctica.  The peak is surmounting Rose Valley Glacier to the northwest and Debelt Glacier to the south.

The feature was named descriptively in a 1935 British chart.

Location

See also
 Varna Peninsula
 Livingston Island

Maps
 L.L. Ivanov et al. Antarctica: Livingston Island and Greenwich Island, South Shetland Islands. Scale 1:100000 topographic map. Sofia: Antarctic Place-names Commission of Bulgaria, 2005.
 L.L. Ivanov. Antarctica: Livingston Island and Greenwich, Robert, Snow and Smith Islands. Scale 1:120000 topographic map.  Troyan: Manfred Wörner Foundation, 2009.

References
 SCAR Composite Antarctic Gazetteer.

Mountains of Livingston Island